The  is a regatta venue for rowing and canoeing, situated in Kōtō and Ōta, Tokyo Bay, in Japan.

History
The venue was built for the 2020 Summer Olympics and Paralympic Games. Construction began in 2016 and it was inaugurated in June 2019. It was built by Tokyo Metropolitan Government on the waterfront site and is the only rowing venue in Japan that meets international standards.

The first international event that was held here were the 2019 World Rowing Junior Championships.

Olympic rowing events are held from 23 to 30 July 2021. The  hopes to be able to continue to maintain it after the Olympics.

In January 2021, it was reported that oysters were attaching themselves to the floats used to suppress waves in the venue, resulting in 140 million yen (US$1.3 million) in costs to remove them.

Location and description

Sea Forest Waterway is located in the special ward of Kōtō. The course is located between two artificial islands, with the buildings associated with the course on Umi no mori. The other island is Reiwajima, which belongs to the Ōta special ward. Tokyo Port Seaside Road is a four-lane highway on Reiwajima, with Tokyo Gate Bridge connecting this road across Tokyo Bay. Tokyo Gate Bridge provides the backdrop to the rowing course looking from start to the finish line.

There are eight lanes. The facility has a 2,000-seat permanent grandstand as well as space for a temporary grandstand for 14,000 more spectators for Olympic events.

The starting pontoons are located immediately adjacent to and north-east of the Chubo-Ohashi Bridge. Haneda Airport is just to the south from here, with planes flying low over Sea Forest Waterway.

References 

Olympic canoeing venues
Olympic rowing venues
Sports venues in Tokyo
Sports venues completed in 2019
2019 establishments in Japan
Venues of the 2020 Summer Olympics